Flit or FLIT may refer to:

 FliT (band), a Ukrainian-American punk rock band
 Flit (computer networking), a link-level atomic piece that forms a network packet or stream
 Flit (horse) (foaled 2016), an Australian thoroughbred racehorse
 FLIT, a brand of insecticide
 River Flit, in Bedfordshire, England
 Flit, a character in the 1966 film Il vostro super agente Flit
 Flit, a hummingbird in the 1995 film Pocahontas

See also
 Flit gun
 Flitter (disambiguation)